Memorial High School is a public high school in St. Marys, Ohio. It is the only high school in the St. Marys City School District. Memorial High School was designated "Excellent" (the highest designation given) by the Ohio Department of Education in the most recent (2007/08) ODE report card. The nickname of their athletic teams is the Roughriders. They are a member of the Western Buckeye League. Although the official name of the high school is Memorial, local media generally refers to the school's athletic teams as the St. Marys Roughriders. The school's colors are royal blue and gold.

On November 7, 2007 St. Marys City School voters passed a bond issue for the construction of a new high school. The building, built for the 2010-2011 school year, is a 9th-grade through 12th-grade complex.

Athletics

Sports offered 
Source:

Fall Sports
 Boys Midget Football 
 Boys Cross Country
 Girls Cross Country
 Boys Soccer
 Girls Soccer
 Girls Tennis
 Girls Volleyball

Winter Sports
 Boys Basketball
 Girls Basketball
 Boys Bowling
 Girls Bowling
 Boys Swimming
 Girls Swimming
 Boys Wrestling

Spring Sports
 Boys Baseball
 Girls Softball
 Boys Tennis
 Boys Track and Field
 Girls Track and Field

Ohio High School Athletic Association Team State Championships

 Boys Football – 1990, 1992, 1993
 Boys Bowling - 2017, 2019
 Girls Bowling - 2011, 2019

OHSAA Team State Runner-Up
 Boys Football - 2004
 Girls Softball - 2007

OHSAA Team State Final Four
 Boys Football - 1977, 1978
 Girls Soccer - 2009
 Girls Softball - 1981, 2007
 Boys Basketball - 1993
 Girls Volleyball - 1998

Notable alumni and faculty

 Galen Cisco (Class of 1954) - Former Major League Baseball pitcher (New York Mets, Boston Red Sox, Kansas City Royals) and coach. Pitching coach for World Series Champion Toronto Blue Jays in 1992-93. Galen Cisco was also co-captain and fullback for Ohio State's 1957 national collegiate football champs.
 Floyd A. Keith (Class of 1965) - Executive Director, Black Coaches & Administrators from 2001 until present. Coached collegiate football for 30 years. Coach Keith was an assistant football coach at Miami University (1970-1973), University of Colorado (1974-1978), University of Arizona (1983), and Indiana University (1984-1992). He was the head football coach at Howard University (1979-1982) and the University of Rhode Island (1993-1999).

Notes and references

External links
 St. Marys Memorial High School Website
 Western Buckeye League official website

High schools in Auglaize County, Ohio
Public high schools in Ohio
1912 establishments in Ohio